The University of Texas Inter-Cooperative Council (ICC) is a student owned and operated housing cooperative serving students and community members in Austin, Texas. ICC Austin is an active member of NASCO.

Each house community is run primarily by its student members and elected stewards with oversight from full-time staff members. The nine communities differ in terms of types of dinners served (omnivorous, vegan, or vegetarian), rules regarding pets and alcohol consumption, and various other traditions.

Houses

ICC Austin operates nine houses within the West Campus neighborhood of Austin, Texas. ICC primarily serves students attending local colleges and universities, such as University of Texas at Austin, Austin Community College, and St. Edward's University.

See also
Inter-Cooperative Council at the University of Michigan
NASCO

References

External links
 ICC Austin

Student housing cooperatives in the United States
Residential buildings in Texas
University of Texas System